Micromonospora qiuiae is a Gram-positive bacterium from the genus Micromonospora which has been isolated from mangrove soil in Sanya, China.

References

External links
Type strain of Verrucosispora qiuiae at BacDive -  the Bacterial Diversity Metadatabase	

Micromonosporaceae
Bacteria described in 2012